is the third single by Japanese music trio Candies. Written by Kazumi Yasui and Kōichi Morita, the single was released on April 21, 1974.

The song peaked at No. 46 on Oricon's singles chart and sold over 38,000 copies.

Track listing 
All lyrics are written by Kazumi Yasui; all music is written by Kōichi Morita; all music is arranged by Kōji Ryūzaki.

Chart positions

Cover versions 
 Michie Tomizawa, Yūko Mizutani, and Megumi Hayashibara covered the song as the ending theme of the 1990 anime OVA Ariel Sesshoku-hen: The Beginning.
 Utahime Gakudan covered the song in their 2006 album Saishokusenringiku.
 The Possible covered the song in their 2007 debut album 1 Be Possible!.

References

External links 
 
 

1974 singles
1974 songs
Japanese-language songs
Candies (group) songs
Sony Music Entertainment Japan singles
Songs written by Koichi Morita (songwriter)